The Phosphorescent Rat is the fourth album by the blues rock group Hot Tuna, released in early 1974 as Grunt BFL1-0348. This was the first Hot Tuna album recorded after guitarist Jorma Kaukonen and bass player Jack Casady had left Jefferson Airplane. They were joined as before by drummer Sammy Piazza, though Papa John Creach had left the band for Jefferson Starship. The band's playing was moving away from the softer, more acoustic sound of their first three albums, and towards a hard rock sound that would be explored on their next three albums.

Track listing
All songs written by Jorma Kaukonen, except where noted

Personnel
Jorma Kaukonen – vocals, guitars
Jack Casady – electric bass, bass balalaika
Sammy Piazza – drums, spoons, percussion

Additional personnel
Tom Salisbury – conductor of strings and woodwinds on "Corners Without Exits" and "Soliloquy for 2"
Andrew Narell – steel drums on "Living Just for You"

Production
Pat Ieraci – production coordinator
Mallory Earl – recording engineer, mixing engineer
Steve Mantoani – assistant engineer
Marek A. Majewski – cover design
Recorded at Wally Heider's, San Francisco
Mastered at The Lacquer Channel, Sausalito

References

1973 albums
Albums recorded at Wally Heider Studios
Grunt Records albums
Hot Tuna albums